Lenz–Majewski syndrome (LMS), also known as Lenz–Majewski hyperostotic dwarfism (LMHD), is a skin condition characterized by hyperostosis, craniodiaphyseal dysplasia, dwarfism, cutis laxa, proximal symphalangism, syndactyly, brachydactyly, intellectual disability, enamel hypoplasia and hypertelorism.

Genetics

In 2013, whole-exome sequencing showed that a missense mutation resulting in overactive phosphatidylserine synthase 1 was the cause of LMS, making it the first known human disease to be caused by disrupted phosphatidylserine metabolism. The researchers suggested a link between the condition and bone metabolism.

See also
 Skin lesion

References

External links 

 

Genodermatoses
Genetic disorders with OMIM but no gene
Syndromes